The Japanese manga Fullmetal Alchemist was written and illustrated by Hiromu Arakawa. It has been serialized in Square Enix's Monthly Shōnen Gangan since its August 2001 issue (published on July 12, 2001) and concluded on its July 2010 issue (published in June 2010) with a total of 108 chapters. The plot follows the adventures of two alchemist brothers named Edward and Alphonse Elric. They are striving to find the legendary Philosopher's Stone so that they may recover parts of their bodies that they lost in an attempt to bring their mother back to life. Therefore, Edward joins the state military and discovers that several members of the military are also attempting to get the stone.

Square Enix collected the chapters in tankōbon form. The first volume was released on January 22, 2002, and the last, volume 27, was released on November 22, 2010. A few chapters have been rereleased in Japan in two "Extra number" magazines and Fullmetal Alchemist: The First Attack, which features the first nine chapters of the manga as well as other side stories. On July 22, 2011, Square Enix started republishing the series in kanzenban format. Viz Media is releasing English language editions of the manga in North America. The first volume was released on May 3, 2005, and the last one, was officially released on December 20, 2011. On June 7, 2011, Viz started publishing the series in omnibus format, featuring three volumes in one.

The animation studio Bones adapted the manga into two separate animated adaptations. The first ran in October 2003 for 51 episodes with changes made from the manga and it was followed by a film sequel in 2005. In April 2009, Bones started running a new 64 episode anime adaptation directly based on the manga entitled Fullmetal Alchemist: Brotherhood for the North American release.



Volume list

References

External links
 Official Gangan Fullmetal Alchemist manga and novel website  
 

Fullmetal Alchemist
Fullmetal Alchemist